Castel d'Aiano is a comune (municipality) in the Metropolitan City of Bologna in the northern Italian region of Emilia-Romagna, located in the Apennine mountains about  southwest of Bologna.

Castel d'Aiano borders the following municipalities: Gaggio Montano, Montese, Vergato, Zocca.

In April 1945, while engaged in combat in the area, Bob Dole was  wounded by a German shell that struck his right arm

References

External links
 Official website

Cities and towns in Emilia-Romagna